Talysh may refer to:

Talysh people
History of Talysh
Talysh language
Talysh Khanate, in existence from 1747 to 1828
Talysh-Mughan Autonomous Republic, a self-declared autonomy, which existed briefly in the south of Azerbaijan in 1993
Talysh Mountains
Flag of Talysh

See also
Talesh (disambiguation)
Talış (disambiguation)
Talish (disambiguation)

Language and nationality disambiguation pages